Transtillaspis neelys is a species of moth of the family Tortricidae. It is found in Ecuador in Napo and Tungurahua provinces.

The wingspan is 18.5 mm. The ground colour of the forewings is white, preserved in form of numerous dots and spots. The forewings are strigulated (finely streaked) with grey brown and grey along the costa and proximally. The remaining area is cinnamon with browner strigulae (finely streaked). The hindwings are creamy grey, but brownish grey on the periphery.

Etymology
The species name refers to the late recognition of the species and is derived from Latin neelys (meaning lately arrived).

References

Moths described in 2005
Transtillaspis
Moths of South America
Taxa named by Józef Razowski